The English Channel scallop fishing dispute, also called the Great Scallop War or guerre de la coquille, occurred on 10 October 2012 or 8 October 2012, between British and French fishermen in the Channel  off the coast of Le Havre, France. The dispute arose because of a difference in fishing restrictions between the two countries. British scallop fishers are allowed to fish for scallops year round, whilst French scallop fishers are not permitted to fish between 15 May and 1 October each year. Other confrontations took place in the same area on 28 August 2018 and 13 October 2020.

2012
Approximately 20 French fishing boats surrounded five British fishing boats and, according to the British fishermen, tried to ram the British boats, throwing rocks and nets and attempting to damage their propellers and engines. French fishermen claim their actions were in response to the British boats being inside the European Union's Common Fisheries Policy  fishing exclusion zone; British fishermen deny that they were within the exclusion zone.

The British Marine Management Organisation informed French authorities; the French Navy intervened and a meeting took place between the French and British fishermen to resolve the dispute.

2018
On 28 August, 35 French fishing boats tried to prevent several British fishing vessels from catching sea scallops off the Normandy coast. Violence began when three large British trawlers were chased by the French fishing boats. British trawlers Golden Promise and Joanna C were damaged after being rammed and hit by stones, metal shackles, petrol bombs and rocket flares, and were eventually forced to seek shelter at Brixham. Scottish dredger Honeybourne III attempted to ram a number of French boats after a fire erupted on board; three French vessels were also damaged. The Scottish trawler eventually docked at Shoreham. The violence was condemned by both British and French officials. Talks started on 5 September but by 12 September had failed to conclude, owing to British and French intransigence. The French Navy vowed to intervene in the event of future clashes.

Subsequently, a "crab war" developed in which the British claimed that the French fishermen deliberately damaged their crab pots. This violence was also condemned by both British and French officials.

2020

Further incidents occurred in 2020. On 13 October two British boats, Golden Promise and Girl Macey, based in Brixham, were in the Baie de Seine, near the 12-mile French territorial limit. One of the boats was surrounded by five French boats, the other by fifteen. Flares, oil and frying pans were thrown at the British boats by the French. The French boats also jammed frequencies used by the 
British trawlers.

See also

1993 Cherbourg incident
Cod Wars
Lobster War
Turbot War

References

History of the English Channel
Fishing in France
Fishing in the United Kingdom
Conflicts in 2012
France–United Kingdom relations
Fishing conflicts
2012 in France
2012 in the United Kingdom
2012 in international relations
October 2012 events in Europe
2018 in France
2018 in the United Kingdom
2018 in international relations
August 2018 events in Europe
Maritime incidents in France